Melissa Carmen Bulanhagui (born August 16, 1990) is an American former figure skater. She represented the United States internationally from 2005 through 2010. She became the 2006 U.S. junior national bronze medalist and won two ISU Junior Grand Prix medals (gold at 2008 JGP Italy, silver at 2006 JGP Romania). After moving up to the senior ranks, she won bronze at the 2010 Nebelhorn Trophy. In 2011, she decided to compete for the Philippines. She would win bronze at the 2013 Asian Open Trophy and two Philippine national titles (2012, 2013). She also competed at two Four Continents Championships.

In 2019, she became a pornographic actress under the stage name Jada Kai.

Career

Figure skating
Bulanhagui won the junior bronze medal at the 2006 U.S. Championships. She made her ISU Junior Grand Prix debut the following season, winning a silver medal and placing 4th in her other event. She qualified for the Final where she finished 4th.

In 2007, Bulanhagui sprained her right ankle twice and tore a ligament while practicing triple lutzes. During the 2008–09 season, she won a gold medal at the Junior Grand Prix event in Italy and placed 9th in her other event. In September 2010, she won her first senior international medal – bronze at the Nebelhorn Trophy in Germany.

In September 2011, Bulanhagui announced that she would compete at the national championships of the Philippines in November 2011 and would become eligible for international events in the 2012–13 season. She placed 17th at the 2013 Four Continents Championships, which took place in February in Osaka, Japan. In August 2013, she won bronze at the Asian Open Figure Skating Trophy. She finished 15th at the 2015 Four Continents Championships in Seoul, South Korea.

Pornography
Since 2019, Bulanhagui works as a pornographic actress under the stage name Jada Kai.

Personal life 
Bulanhagui's parents are both from the Philippines. She speaks and understands some Tagalog although she is not fluent. She received her Philippine passport in October 2011.

Programs

Competitive highlights

For the Philippines

For the United States

References

External links
 
 Official website (archived version)
 

American female single skaters
Filipino female single skaters
1990 births
Living people
University of Delaware people
Gymnasts from Philadelphia
American female adult models
American pornographic film actresses
American actresses of Filipino descent
Pornographic film actors from Pennsylvania